Clara Rachel Salaman (born 19 May 1967 in Islington, London) is an English actress and author.

She is known for playing the role of DS Claire Stanton in the long running ITV drama The Bill from 1999 to 2001. She first appeared on The Bill as a victim, Penny Thompson, on episode 6 of series 11 in 1995.

She has also appeared in several other television programmes, including A Touch of Frost and Kingdom.

She has written a play for the National Theatre and a screenplay for Granada Television. She has also written her first novel, Shame on You, and in a related piece recalled her own family upbringing as part of an unnamed religious cult in The Guardian in July 2009. Her second novel, The Boat, appeared in 2014, based on her real experience aged 18 when Salaman and her fiancé hitched a ride on a yacht with couple who claimed to sexually abuse their young daughter. While criticisms were made of Salaman's failure to report the suspected abuse, Salaman provided her reasoning to The Guardian.

External links

References 

1967 births
English television actresses
Living people
People educated at St James Independent Schools